Chen Changzhi (born July 1945 in Hubei Province) is a Chinese politician who was the chairman of the China Democratic National Construction Association, a legally recognized non-Communist political party in China, and one of the vice chairmen of the Standing Committee of the National People's Congress of the People's Republic of China.

References

1945 births
Living people
Chairperson and vice chairpersons of the Standing Committee of the 12th National People's Congress
Members of the China National Democratic Construction Association
People's Republic of China politicians from Hubei
Politicians from Xiaogan